Ahmed el-Aash (born January 1, 1998)  is an Egyptian professional footballer. He plays as a centre-back for Egyptian Premier League club Ismaily as well as the Egypt U-20 national team.

Club career

Early career
Aash started his football career in 2007 in Al Ahly youth team as a centre-back, and was a product of Pepsi Egyptian Schools League.

References

1998 births
Living people
Egyptian footballers
Association football defenders
Ismaily SC players
Al Ahly SC players
Footballers from Cairo
Egyptian expatriate footballers
Egyptian expatriate sportspeople in Tunisia
Egyptian expatriate sportspeople in Kuwait
Expatriate footballers in Tunisia
Expatriate footballers in Kuwait